Qoliabad (also Romanized as Qolīābād) is a village in Nanur Rural District, Nanur District, Baneh County, Kurdistan Province, Iran. At the 2006 census, its population was 95, in 16 families. The village is populated by Kurds.

References 

Towns and villages in Baneh County
Kurdish settlements in Kurdistan Province